Mohammad Shubid Ali Bhuiyan is a retired Bangladesh Army officer and present Awami League politician and Member of Parliament for Comilla-1.

Birth and early life 
Shubid Ali Bhuiyan was born in Comilla District on 28 July 1945.

Career
He graduated from Dhaka University's Islamic history and culture department. In 1966 he joined Pakistan Army. In 1969 he was transferred to East Bengal Regiment. He fought under the command of Major General Ziaur Rahman in the Bangladesh Liberation War. From 1991 to 1996 he was the Armed Forces Division’s Principal Staff Officer under Prime Minister Khaleda Zia of Bangladesh Nationalist Party. His name came up in the Purulia arms drop case as his signature was on the end user certificate.

In 2001 he attempted to get the Bangladesh Nationalist Party nomination to contest the parliamentary election. He contested 2008 parliamentary election under Awami League and was elected member of Parliament from Daudkandi, Comilla. He is the Chairman of parliamentary standing committee on Defence.

References

1945 births
Living people
People from Comilla District
Principal Staff Officers (Bangladesh)
Bangladesh Army generals
Awami League politicians
9th Jatiya Sangsad members
11th Jatiya Sangsad members
10th Jatiya Sangsad members